Enzo Di Pede (born January 3, 1957) is a retired Italian-born goalkeeper who played in the North American Soccer League and the original Major Indoor Soccer League (MISL).

Career 
In 1976, he played in the National Soccer League with Toronto Italia for three seasons. Di Pede was a member of the MISL Champion New York Arrows as a backup goalkeeper in 1979–1980.  Di Pede won MISL Goalkeeper of the Year honors in 1981 as a member of the Chicago Horizons and later played for the Kansas City Comets.  On October 7, 1986, the Minnesota Strikers signed Di Pede, but he spent the season as a backup.

International career  
Di Pede played with the Canada men's national under-23 soccer team, and made his debut on April 1, 1979 against Bermuda.

Personal life 
Born in Italy, he and his family immigrated to Toronto, Ontario, Canada. Di Pede idolized long-time Italian national team goalkeeper Dino Zoff as a young soccer player.

Di Pede led a series of youth soccer camps in Kansas City, Missouri, U.S. with several fellow MISL players.  After retiring, Di Pede, along with teammate Gino Schiraldi, opened a bagel shop and catering company in Kansas City.

References

External links
 Career stats

1957 births
Canadian expatriate sportspeople in the United States
Canadian expatriate soccer players
Canadian soccer players
Toronto Italia players
Chicago Horizons players
Association football goalkeepers
Italian emigrants to Canada
Kansas City Comets (original MISL) players
Canadian National Soccer League players
Major Indoor Soccer League (1978–1992) players
New York Arrows players
North American Soccer League (1968–1984) players
Rochester Lancers (1967–1980) players
Living people
People from Sora, Lazio
Sportspeople from the Province of Frosinone
Footballers from Lazio